Menegazzia enteroxantha is a species of foliose lichen found in Australia. It was first formally described as a new to science by Swiss botanist Johannes Müller Argoviensis in 1896, as a specis of Parmelia. Rolf Santesson transferred the taxon to genus Menegazzia in 1942.

See also
List of Menegazzia species

References

enteroxantha
Lichen species
Lichens described in 1896
Taxa named by Johannes Müller Argoviensis
Lichens of Australia